Oliver Straube (born 13 December 1971) is a German former professional footballer who played as a midfielder. He spent four seasons in the Bundesliga with 1. FC Nürnberg, Hamburger SV and SpVgg Unterhaching.

References

Living people
1971 births
German footballers
Association football midfielders
Bundesliga players
1. FC Nürnberg players
KFC Uerdingen 05 players
Hamburger SV players
SpVgg Unterhaching players
SSV Jahn Regensburg players
TuS Koblenz players